1017 Mafia: Incarcerated is a mixtape by American rapper Gucci Mane. The mixtape was released on January 3, 2015, by 1017 Records and 101 Distribution. The album features guest appearances from Migos, Peewee Longway, Rich The Kid, Waka Flocka Flame, OG Maco, Young Scooter and Young Thug.

Track listing

References

2015 albums
Gucci Mane albums
Albums produced by Nard & B
Albums produced by Honorable C.N.O.T.E.
Albums produced by Southside (record producer)
Albums produced by Zaytoven
Albums produced by Drumma Boy